Different Perspectives is the debut album by trombonist Robin Eubanks which was recorded in 1988 and released on the JMT label.

Reception
The AllMusic review by Michael G. Nastos said it was "An exceptional first album from this trombonist. A great listening album with many components, mostly in a progressive vein".

Track listing
All compositions by Robin Eubanks except as indicated
 "Midtown" - 6:29  
 "The Night Before" - 5:01  
 "Taicho" - 7:20  
 "You Don't Know What Love Is" (Don Raye, Gene de Paul) - 9:03  
 "Overjoyed" (Stevie Wonder) - 5:02  
 "Walkin'" (Richard Carpenter) - 7:19  
 "Different Perspectives" – 12:53

Personnel
Robin Eubanks - trombone
Kevin Eubanks - guitar
James Weidman - keyboards
Rael Wesley Grant - electric bass
Peter Washington - bass
Terri Lyne Carrington, Jeff "Tain" Watts - drums
Steve Coleman - saxophones
Michael Mossman - trumpet
Slide Hampton, Clifton Anderson, Douglas Purviance - trombone

References 

1989 debut albums
Robin Eubanks albums
JMT Records albums
Winter & Winter Records albums